The USCGC Mustang (WPB-1310), (named after Mustang Island off the coast of Texas), is an Island-class cutter of the United States Coast Guard. She is stationed in Seward, Alaska, at the top of the Gulf of Alaska.  Mustang is one of seven Island-class patrol boats in Alaska.  Her primary objective is maritime safety, though she is a multiple-role ship.

Design
The Island-class patrol boats were constructed in Bollinger Shipyards, Lockport, Louisiana. It is powered two Paxman Valenta 16 CM diesel engines or two Caterpillar 3516 diesel engines. It has two  3304T diesel generators made by Caterpillar; these can serve as motor–generators. Its hull is constructed from highly strong steel, and the superstructure and major deck are constructed from aluminium.

It is fitted with one  cannon and two  M60 light machine guns; it may also be fitted with two Browning .50 Caliber Machine Guns. It is fitted with satellite navigation systems, collision avoidance systems, surface radar, and a Loran C system. Its complement is sixteen (two officers and fourteen crew members). Island-class patrol boats are based on Vosper Thornycroft  patrol boats and have similar dimensions.

References

 

Ships of the United States Coast Guard
1986 ships
Island-class patrol boats
Ships built in Lockport, Louisiana